The canton of Pays morcenais tarusate is an administrative division of the Landes department, southwestern France. It was created at the French canton reorganisation which came into effect in March 2015. Its seat is in Tartas.

It consists of the following communes:
 
Arengosse
Audon
Bégaar
Beylongue
Carcarès-Sainte-Croix
Carcen-Ponson
Gouts
Laluque
Lamothe
Lesgor
Lesperon
Le Leuy
Meilhan
Morcenx-la-Nouvelle
Onesse-Laharie
Ousse-Suzan
Pontonx-sur-l'Adour
Rion-des-Landes
Saint-Yaguen
Souprosse
Tartas
Villenave
Ygos-Saint-Saturnin

References

Cantons of Landes (department)